Charles LaVerne Nelson (born February 23, 1960) is a former professional football player, a placekicker in the National Football League.  Nelson played college football for the University of Washington, and earned All-American honors.  He played professionally in the NFL for five seasons with the Los Angeles Rams, Buffalo Bills, and Minnesota Vikings.  Following his playing career, Nelson worked in investment management and broadcasting in the Seattle area. He did local cable telecasts and was the color commentator on radio for Husky football games for 17 years, through the 2009 season.  Nelson was the director of the Boeing Classic golf tournament on the Champions Tour for its first five years, and was named president and CEO of the Washington Athletic Club in January 2012.

Born in Seattle, Washington, Nelson grew up in Everett and graduated from Everett High School in 1978. He then attended the University of Washington, where he played for the football team from 1979 to 1982.  As a senior in 1982, he was recognized as a consensus first-team All-American.  He was selected in the fourth round of the 1983 NFL Draft by the Los Angeles Rams, the 87th overall pick.

Nelson was inducted into the UW Husky Hall of Fame in 1998.

See also
 Washington Huskies football statistical leaders

References

External links
Go Huskies.com - UW Hall of Fame - Chuck Nelson

1960 births
Living people
All-American college football players
American football placekickers
Buffalo Bills players
Los Angeles Rams players
Minnesota Vikings players
Players of American football from Seattle
Washington Huskies football players
Washington Huskies football announcers